Sunset Productions, Inc. was a television production and licensing subsidiary of Warner Bros. Pictures headed by Jack M. Warner. It was an entity separate from Warner Bros. Television.

History
Sunset was originally established as a subsidiary of Warner Bros. that focused on television. Its first production was a series of half-hour shows.

On February 12, 1955, Warner Bros. sold the TV distribution rights to 191 of their black-and-white cartoons to Guild Films through Sunset. The cartoons part of the deal were the black-and-white Looney Tunes and all of the non-Harman-Ising black-and-white Merrie Melodies. All references to Warner Bros. in the cartoons were removed because Warner did not want to antagonize theater owners as a result of their television deals. Guild Films would hold onto the TV distribution rights to the cartoons until its bankruptcy on March 6, 1961, and the TV rights to the 191 cartoons would be acquired by Seven Arts Productions.

Sunset eventually began to produce TV commercials. In April 1957, Sunset Productions changed its name to Warner Bros. TV Commercial and Industrial Films. Jack M. Warner would continue to run the subsidiary.

References

Warner Bros. divisions
Looney Tunes